Finnhems Oy is a government owned non-profit joint-stock company that manages the nationwide system of medical helicopters in Finland.
Finnhems hires the helicopter companies that provide the Air medical services in Finland and oversees the medical helicopter bases around the country.
Currently the helicopter companies that operate in Finland under Finnhems are Babcock Scandinavian AirAmbulance and Skärgårdshavets Helikoptertjänst
that use Airbus EC 145 T2, 145 T2 and Eurocopter EC135 P2 Single Pilot IFR helicopters.

There are six medical helicopter bases each with one helicopter and ground unit (FH10) Vantaa,(FH20) Turku,(FH30) Tampere,(FH50) Oulu ,(FH51) Rovaniemi , (FH60) Kuopio.
 
All of the medical helicopters have a medical doctor onboard except for the Rovaniemi unit which has a paramedic. Finnhems flights rarely transport anyone to the hospital but rather bring the emergency medicine to the patient that usually gets transferred via an ambulance that has also been dispatched to the scene. To dispatch a Finnhems unit an Emergency medical dispatcher consults a doctor and makes a risk assessment on whether one is needed. The most common reasons that a unit is dispatched are Cardiac arrest, Unconsciousness, Chest pain and Traffic accidents

Finnhems medical helicopters and ground units are on call 24/7 around the year to ensure that intensive care level emergency medicine reaches the people of Finland on time which is critical in bad cases of medical emergencies. in 2014 the medical helicopters responded to 14 444 calls around the country.

References

External links 

 Finnhems website in English

Air ambulance services
Government-owned companies of Finland